This table showing the various foreign communities in Algeria :

References